Beatrice Eileen Faust  (19 February 1939 – 30 October 2019) was an Australian author and women's activist. In 1966 she was president of the Victorian Abortion Law Repeal Association. She was also a co-founder of the Women's Electoral Lobby in 1972 and co-founder of the Victorian Union of Civil Liberties .

Life and career

Beatrice Faust was born Beatrice Eileen Fennessey in Glen Huntly, a suburb of Melbourne, on 19 February 1939. Her mother died shortly after having given birth. This had been predicted by doctors, who knew of a uterine canal anomaly which would lead to such, however being of Roman Catholic and Irish descent the use of contraceptives was denied her parents and subsequently her mother became pregnant.

She was brought up by her father, three aunts and an extended Irish family, her great-grandmother Boule having arrived in Australia in 1848 as a consequence of the Great Famine and father at a later date.

She attended Melbourne University in the 1950s, where she became acquainted with Germaine Greer and they extended their feminist inclinations through various cogitations, earning her bachelor's degree in English and subsequently her master's degree. Much later in her life, the higher degrees of PhD and LLD were conferred upon her, the former for her 1991 book Apprenticeship in Liberty and the latter for her life's work in general, as a social reformist and researcher.

The first of her two marriages was to Clive Faust during her time at university. Having become known as a public figure with the Faust surname, when they later divorced she retained the name.

She had one child, Stephen David, born out of wedlock in 1965 from her relationship with the Finnish academic Adam (Aimo) Murtonen.

She was one of the first women to argue for civil liberties, abortion law reform and well-informed sex education for all.  In 1966 she co-founded the Victorian Union of Civil Liberties to advocate for civil rights and, in 1972, the Women's Electoral Lobby, to agitate for legislative reform along specifically feminist lines and to give Australian women a greater voice in politics.

In 2001 Faust was awarded the Centenary Medal.  In the same year, she was inducted into the Victorian Honour Roll of Women. In 2004 she was appointed an Officer of the Order of Australia for such efforts and more.

Among her early writings, she contributed to the Australian edition of The Little Red Schoolbook and, during the 1970s, she wrote regularly as a reviewer of films, and also photography exhibitions, for The Age newspaper, as well as contributing to Nation Review and elsewhere. Later, in the late 1980s into the 1990s, she had a regular column in the Weekend Australian, one result of which was a court case involving Jeff Kennett, the then Victorian premier.

In the latter part of her career she returned to one of her earliest vocations, as a teacher, becoming a lecturer in English at, first, RMIT, Melbourne, and then Monash University, Victoria, where she widened the scope her concern to include the educational syllabus of Australia on a more general level.

After her retirement she lived in Churchill, a town in Gippsland, Victoria.

Bibliography

Books

 Women, Sex and Pornography, Penguin Books, Melbourne 1980, 
 Benzo Junkie: More than a case history, Penguin Books, Melbourne 1993
 Apprenticeship In Liberty, Angus & Robertson, North Ryde NSW 1991, currently Out Of Print
 Backlash? Balderdash!, UNSW, Sydney NSW 1994,

Essays

 The paedophiles , a chapter in the book The Betrayal of Youth - Radical Perspectives on Childhood Sexuality, Intergenerational Sex, and the Social Oppression of Children and Young People; Edited by Warren Middleton; CL Publications, London; 1986

References

Further reading
Adelaide, Debra (1988) Australian women writers: a bibliographic guide, London, Pandora
Mitchell, Susan (1984) Tall Poppies, Sydney, Angus and Robertson.

External links
 Beatrice Faust and WEL

1939 births
2019 deaths
Australian feminist writers
Australian people of Irish descent
Australian women journalists
Activists from Melbourne
Journalists from Melbourne
Officers of the Order of Australia
Recipients of the Centenary Medal
University of Melbourne alumni
Academic staff of the University of Melbourne
University of Melbourne women
Academic staff of RMIT University
Academic staff of Monash University
People from Glen Huntly, Victoria
People educated at Mac.Robertson Girls' High School